Fate is a 1913 silent short film directed by D. W. Griffith and produced and distributed by the Biograph Company.

This film survives in the Library of Congress collection.

Cast
Charles Hill Mailes – Sim Sloane
Robert Harron – The Beloved Son
John T. Dillon – A Friend
Lionel Barrymore – Father, Loving Family
Mae Marsh – Mother, Loving Family

rest of cast
William J. Butler
Gladys Egan – At School
Frank Evans – In Bar
Charles Gorman – A Villager
Adolph Lestina – In Bar
Walter P. Lewis – In Bar/A Villager
Joseph McDermott – A Hunter
Alfred Paget –
Jack Pickford – At School
Mary Pickford –

See also
Lionel Barrymore filmography

References

External links
Fate at IMDb.com

1913 films
American silent short films
Films directed by D. W. Griffith
Biograph Company films
American black-and-white films
Surviving American silent films
1913 short films
1913 drama films
Silent American drama films
1910s American films